HMS Nestor, launched on 22 December 1915, was an . She served in the 13th Destroyer Flotilla of the Grand Fleet and was sunk on 31 May 1916 at the Battle of Jutland.  The Wreck is designated as a protected place under the Protection of Military Remains Act 1986

Battle of Jutland
Nestor took part in an attack upon the German battlecruiser squadron commanded by Admiral Franz von Hipper, which was engaged by the British battlecruiser squadron under Admiral David Beatty at the start of the battle of Jutland. Twelve destroyers were despatched to approach the line of German battlecruisers and attack with torpedoes. The attack was met part-way to their target by a German destroyer squadron which exchanged fire as the ships passed. The German battlecruisers turned away, so Nestor also turned back towards the British battlecruisers. However, it now became clear the German battlecruisers had altered course to align with the main German High Seas Fleet, which was now just visible. Nestor was hit and disabled, requiring Nicator to veer off at the last minute from firing its torpedoes so as to avoid a collision. Nicator then broke off and returned to the British squadron. Nestor and Nomad, both disabled after their attack on the battlecruisers, were left to face the approach of the entire German battle fleet. The two ships fired their remaining torpedoes at the approaching enemy, before inevitably being sunk. Nomad was closest, so was attacked first and sank after a few minutes receiving fire. Her surviving crew were picked up by German ships.

Commander Edward Bingham ordered all charts and confidential books to be destroyed, and the ship's boats and rafts to be provided with water and biscuits and to be launched. He then ordered his crew to lay out cables, as if in anticipation of a tow, simply as an exercise to keep them occupied. German ships opened fire when they reached a range of five miles. The last torpedo was launched, but after only two or three minutes fire, the ship was sinking rapidly and was abandoned. Nestor sank at approximately 5.30 pm.

References

Bibliography

External links
 http://www.battleships-cruisers.co.uk/destroyers_before_1900.htm
 SI 2008/0950 Designation under the Protection of Military Remains Act 1986

External links 

 Battle of Jutland Crew Lists Project - HMS Nestor Crew List

 

Admiralty M-class destroyers
Ships built on the River Tyne
1915 ships
World War I destroyers of the United Kingdom
Maritime incidents in 1916
Ships sunk at the Battle of Jutland
Protected Wrecks of the United Kingdom